Chibás is a surname. Notable people with the surname include:

Eduardo Chibás (1907–1951), Cuban politician
Marcela Chibás (born 1951), Cuban sprinter
Raúl Chibás (1916–2002), Cuban politician and military officer, brother of Eduardo

Surnames of Cuban origin